Ghetto Blaster is the last full-length album by the Red Aunts.  It was released on April 21, 1998, on Epitaph Records.

It was produced by Mick Collins, of the Gories.

Critical reception
The Albuquerque Journal called the album a "garage rock classic," listing it as one of the best albums of 1998. The San Diego Union-Tribune wrote that "these no-nonsense punk rock grrrls capture the intensity of a small club, and more important, the noisiness of one, too."

Track listing
"I'm Crying" – 3:54
"Poison Steak" – 2:04
"The Things You See, The Things You Don't" – 2:01
"Midnight in the Jungle" – 3:29
"Exene" – 2:59
"Fade In/Fade Out" – 3:07
"Alright!" – 2:11
"Who?" – 2:08
"Skeleton Hand" – 3:29
"Wrecked" – 1:39
"I'm Bored With You" – 0:40
"Cookin', Cleanin' and Cryin'" – 3:50

References

Red Aunts albums
1998 albums